The 2006 Manx Grand Prix motorcycle races for amateur competitors took place from 28 August to 1 September over the Snaefell Mountain Course. The English rider Craig Atkinson won both the Junior and Senior Grand Prix races.

Newcomers Race A
Monday 28 August 2006 – Mountain Course (4 laps – 150.92 miles)
 Two-stroke motorcycles exceeding 250 cc and not exceeding 750 cc.
 Four-stroke motorcycles exceeding 400 cc and not exceeding 750 cc.
 Twin/three-cylinder motorcycles exceeding 600 cc and not exceeding 1000 cc.

Newcomers Race C
Monday 28 August 2006 – Mountain Course (4 laps – 150.92 miles)
 Two-stroke motorcycles exceeding 125 cc and 6 gears.
 Four-stroke motorcycles exceeding 250 cc and not exceeding 400 cc.

Senior Classic Race
Monday 28 August 2006 – Mountain Course (4 laps – 150.92 miles)
 For motorcycles exceeding 350 cc and not exceeding 500 cc.

Junior Classic Race
Wednesday 30 August 2006 – Mountain Course (4 laps – 150.92 miles)
 Class A for motorcycles exceeding 300 cc and not exceeding 350 cc.

Lightweight Classic Race
Wednesday 30 August 2006 – Mountain Course (4 laps – 150.92 miles)
 Class B for motorcycles exceeding 175 cc and not exceeding 250 cc.

Junior Manx Grand Prix
Wednesday 30 August 2006 – Mountain Course (4 laps – 150.92 miles)
 Two-stroke motorcycles exceeding 200 cc and not exceeding 350 cc.
 Four-stroke four-cylinder motorcycles exceeding 450 cc and not exceeding 600 cc.
 Four-stroke twin-cylinder motorcycles exceeding 600 cc and not exceeding 750 cc.

Lightweight Manx Grand Prix
Friday 1 September 2006 – Mountain Course (4 laps – 150.92 miles)

Senior Manx Grand Prix
Friday 1 September 2006 – Mountain Course (4 laps – 150.92 miles)
 Four-stroke four-cylinder motorcycles exceeding 450 cc and not exceeding 750 cc.
 Four-stroke twin-cylinder motorcycles exceeding 600 cc and not exceeding 1000 cc.

Sources

External links
 Detailed race results
 Mountain Course map

2006
Manx
Manx
Manx